Kay Lindjuwanga is an Aboriginal Australian artist from Maningrida in the Northern Territory of Australia. She is known for her bark paintings which often make use of Aboriginal rrark designs.

Biography 
Kay Lindjuwanga was born in 1957 and is part of the Kuninjku language group in Australia. Her father is artist, Peter Marralwanga and she learned to paint with the help of her husband and acclaimed artist, John Mawurndjul.

Lindjuwanga grew up with brothers, Ivan Namirrkki and Samuel Namunjdja, who both became successful artists.

Lindjuwanga and Mawurndjul were married in 1973, and Lindjuwanga gave birth to their first child, daughter Pamela Djawulba, later that year. The couple went on to have their second child, daughter Anna Wurrkidj in 1975, and their son Jimbesta (referred to as Sylvester) in 1978. Another son, Noah Wurrkidj was born in 1981, followed by daughters Josephine Wurrkidj and Semeria Wurrkidj are born, in 1983 and 1985, respectively. Their daughter Anna Wurrkidj is now an accomplished painter.

Mawurndjul would help Lindjuwanga develop her skills in art by letting her fill in various sketches he created. This process was also a way of Mawurndjul giving her permission to use his Kurulk clan designs. Lindjuwanga now paints both the clan designs of her husband, and the Kardbam designs from her own clan.

Career 
Lindjuwanga followed her husband John Mawurndjul the development of an abstract style of painting, which draws upon ceremonial cross-hatched designs, known as rrark. As a part of this group, Lindjuwanga uses abstract images inspired by ceremonial designs and ancestral power. Kay Lindjuwanga was awarded the Telstra Bark Painting prize at the National Aboriginal and Torres Strait Islander Art Awards for her work Buluwana at Dilebang on August 13, 2004. The award exhibition was held at the Museum and Art Gallery of the Northern Territory in Darwin between August and November of that year. Her first commercial solo exhibition was at Aboriginal and Pacific Art in Sydney.

Collections 

Art Gallery of New South Wales
Art Gallery of South Australia
Hood Museum of Art, Dartmouth College
Kluge-Ruhe Aboriginal Art Collection of the University of Virginia
Museum and Art Gallery of the Northern Territory
Museum Victoria
National Gallery of Australia
National Gallery of Victoria

Significant exhibitions 

 2010: The Dreamers, Art Gallery of New South Wales, Sydney, New South Wales, Australia, 09 May 2009–15 Aug 2010
 2006: Dreaming Their Way: Australian Aboriginal Women Painters. National Museum of Women in the Arts, Washington DC and The Hood Museum of Art at Dartmouth College, Hanover, NH.
2004: 21st National Aboriginal and Torres Strait Islander Art Awards. Museum and Art Gallery of the Northern Territory, Darwin

References

Further reading 

 “Kay Lindjuwanga.” NGV, www.ngv.vic.gov.au/explore/collection/artist/13935/.
 Farram, Steven (2019-04-03). "'Unruly Days: Territory Life, 1911–1921', Museum and Art Gallery of the Northern Territory, Darwin, 30 June 2018–17 May 2020". Australian Historical Studies. 50 (2): 264–266.
 “John Mawurndjul Biography.” Exhibition Guide: John Mawurndjul: I Am the Old and the New, www.johnmawurndjul.com/selected-biographical-notes/.
 Taylor, Luke. "Negotiating Form In Kuninjku Bark-Paintings." Australian Aboriginal Studies, vol. 2008, no. 1, 2008, pp. 56 – 66.
 Taylor, Luke. "'They May Say Tourist, May Say Truly Painting': Aesthetic Evaluation and Meaning of Bark Paintings In Western Arnhem Land, Northern Australia." Journal of the Royal Anthropological Institute, vol. 14, no. 4, 2008, pp. 865 – 885.
Watson, Bronwyn. “Public Works VISUAL ARTS.” The Australian, 10 Sept. 2011.

1957 births
Living people
Australian contemporary artists
Australian Aboriginal artists
20th-century Australian artists
21st-century Australian artists
Artists from the Northern Territory
20th-century Australian women artists
21st-century Australian women artists